Bom Jesus do Itabapoana is a municipality in the Brazilian state of Rio de Janeiro. It had a population of 37,203 as of 2020, and has an area of 598,8 km2. It was founded in 1939, after being separated from the municipality of Itaperuna.

Geography
The northern border of Bom Jesus do Itabapoana is delimited by the Itabapoana River, which divides the states of Rio de Janeiro and Espírito Santo. The city is located 251 km in a straight line from the state capital Rio de Janeiro. Its neighbouring municipalities are:

 São José do Calçado (ES) – north
 Bom Jesus do Norte (ES) – north
 Apiacá (ES) – north
 Mimoso do Sul (ES) – northeast
 Campos dos Goytacazes – east and southeast
 Itaperuna – south and southeast
 Natividade – west
 Varre-Sai – northwest
 Guaçuí (ES)- northwest

References

External links

Municipalities in Rio de Janeiro (state)